Auricular nerve may refer to:

 Lesser auricular nerve, originates from the cervical plexus, composed of branches of spinal nerves C2 and C3
 Posterior auricular nerve, arises from the facial nerve close to the stylomastoid foramen and runs upward in front of the mastoid process
 Great auricular nerve, originates from the cervical plexus, composed of branches of spinal nerves C2 and C3.
 Or any of the auricular branches